John Allen Ford  (born July 31, 1966) is a former American football wide receiver who played professional in the National Football League (NFL) for the Detroit Lions. Ford attended the University of Virginia.

References

External links
 NFL.com player page
 Pro-Football-Reference page

1966 births
Living people
American football wide receivers
Detroit Lions players
Virginia Cavaliers football players
People from Belle Glade, Florida
Players of American football from Florida